John FitzGerald, de facto 12th Earl of Desmond (died December 1536) was the brother of Thomas FitzGerald, 11th Earl of Desmond. Upon his brother's death in 1534, John disputed the title to the earldom of his brother's grandson, James FitzGerald, de jure 12th Earl of Desmond.  

According to the Annals of the Four Masters, John FitzThomas FitzGerald was believed to have instigated the murder of his older brother, James FitzGerald, 8th Earl of Desmond in 1487, and had been expelled by his brother Maurice FitzGerald, 9th Earl of Desmond.

John died in 1536. His grandnephew, the de jure earl, died in 1540, and was succeeded by John's son, James FitzGerald, 13th Earl of Desmond.

Alfred Webb tells us of this earl that he, "being supported by a large faction, was de facto [12th] Earl. This Sir John died about Christmas 1536."

References 

John
15th-century Irish people
16th-century Irish people
1534 deaths
Normans in Ireland
People of the Tudor period
Year of birth unknown
Earls of Desmond (1329 creation)